Eidsvold–Theodore Road is a continuous  road route in the North Burnett and Banana regions of Queensland, Australia. The entire route is signed as State Route 73. It is a state-controlled district road (number 454) rated as a local road of regional significance.

Route description
The road commences as Moreton Street at an intersection with the Burnett Highway (A3) in Eidsvold. It runs south-east, south-west and north-west, skirting the base of Mount Rose (a former gold mining site) before crossing the Burnett River to the west of Eidsvold. On the eastern bank of the river is Tolderodden Conservation Park, formerly part of the Eidsvold pastoral run. It continues to the north-west through Calrossie, Borania and Ballymore State Forests, where it passes the exit to Defence Road, before entering . It passes through Theodore as Railway Parade, Fifth Avenue, and The Boulevard before ending at an intersection with the Leichhardt Highway (A5). The road from Cracow to Theodore follows the eastern side of the Dawson River valley through mostly irrigated farming land.

Road condition
The road is fully sealed and is suitable for caravans and other large vehicles. A $17 million upgrade project was undertaken in 2012 on parts of a  section of the road in the North Burnett Region. This included replacing the steel deck of the Burnett River bridge.

History

The Eidsvold pastoral run was licensed to Thomas Archer in 1848,  and the town reserve was proclaimed in 1890. Gold was discovered in the 1850s but not in significant quantities until 1886, when it grew quickly as a mining town. By the late 1880s it had a population of almost 2,000.

The Cracow pastoral run was established in 1851. Gold was discovered in 1875, but did not lead to a major gold rush.

Pastoral leases were established in the Theodore area, including one named Woolthorpe, from 1850. In 1864 a town named Woolthorpe was surveyed but never developed. From 1893 Woolthorpe Station expanded  
through land acquisitions along the Dawson River.

A pastoral run was also established at Camboon, to the south-east of Theodore.

Primitive roads were cut between the various pastoral runs and their supporting towns, thus in time connecting Cracow to east and west.

In the 1920s a total of 475 small farms were offered for sale along the Dawson River near the town of Castle Creek, which was renamed Theodore in 1926. By this time parts of many of the pastoral runs had been given over to closer settlement. These factors contributed to the  need for a better road from Eidsvold to Theodore.

Inland defence road
Much of it is now either abandoned or incorporated in modern roads. A  segment of the original road still exists as a public road between Cracow and Theodore.

Major intersections
All distances are from Google Maps.

See also

 List of road routes in Queensland
 List of numbered roads in Queensland
 Eidsvold Homestead

References

Roads in Queensland